This is a list of public art in Powys, Wales. This list applies only to works of public art on permanent display in an outdoor public space and does not, for example, include artworks in museums.

Brecon

Brecon Canal Basin

Builth Wells

Bwlch

Cilmeri

Crickhowell

Criggion

Elan Valley

Glasbury

Hay-on-Wye

Knighton

Llandinam

Llandrindod Wells

Llanfair Caereinion

Machynlleth

Montgomery

New Radnor

Newtown

Rhayader

Rhos-y-Meirch

Talgarth

Welshpool

Ystradgynlais

References

Powys
Powys